Ethmia cypraeella is a moth in the family Depressariidae. It is found in northern Venezuela.

The ground color of the forewings is white. The ground color of the hindwings is white, but pale brownish apically. Adults are on wing from April to July.

References

Moths described in 1863
cypraeella